The Balsas River is a river of Tocantins state in central Brazil, a tributary of the Do Sono River.

The river basin includes part of the  Serra Geral do Tocantins Ecological Station, a strictly protected conservation unit created in 2001 to preserve an area of the Cerrado.

See also
List of rivers of Tocantins

References

Brazilian Ministry of Transport

Rivers of Tocantins